Zygoballus is a genus of jumping spiders found in North and South America.

Taxonomy and history
The genus was first described in 1885 by American arachnologists George and Elizabeth Peckham based on the type species Zygoballus rufipes. The name derives from a combination of the Ancient Greek word ζυγόν (zygon), meaning "yoke", and the genus name Ballus. The etymology of Ballus is unknown, but may be related to the Greek word βαλλίζω (ballizo), meaning "dance" or "jump about".

The genus Messua, based on the type species Messua desidiosa, was synonymized with Zygoballus by Eugène Simon in 1903. Simon argued that Messua desidiosa was a transitional species which differed "much less from typical Zygoballus than would seem to be indicated by [the Peckham's] description." This synonymy was reversed by Wayne Maddison in 1996, and Messua restored as a valid genus.

The genus Amerotritte, based on the type species Amerotritte lineata, was synonymized with Zygoballus in 1980 by María Elena Galiano. Galiano stated that the holotype of Amerotritte lineata was actually a very young Zygoballus specimen.

Zygoballus is currently classified in the subtribe Dendryphantina of the family Salticidae (jumping spiders).

Description

Spiders of the genus Zygoballus share a strong resemblance in appearance. The cephalothorax is high and roughly square when viewed from above. It is widest at the posterior eyes, with the ocular quadrangle occupying approximately three-fifths of the cephalothorax. The cephalothorax slopes steeply behind the posterior eyes and the sides of the cephalothorax are nearly vertical. The labium is as long or longer than it is wide. The anterior (first) pair of legs are the largest, with three pairs of spines on the ventral surface of the tibia. Males have obliquely oriented chelicerae with long fangs.

Many species exhibit wide variation in color, size, and markings.

Distribution
Zygoballus is a genus from the New World, ranging from Argentina to Canada. Three species from India were originally placed in Zygoballus, but have been reassigned to other genera.

Species
, the World Spider Catalog accepted the species listed below. One species, Z. quaternus, was previously recognized (prior to 2008), but is now considered a nomen dubium. Several other species are known only from single specimens. In addition to the species listed below, a 2001 phylogenetic analysis suggested that Rhetenor texanus may also belong in Zygoballus, but this has not been accepted by the World Spider Catalog.

 Zygoballus amrishi Makhan, 2005 — Suriname
 Zygoballus aschnae Makhan, 2005 — Suriname
 Zygoballus concolor Bryant, 1940 — Cuba
 Zygoballus electus Chickering, 1946 — Panama
 Zygoballus gracilipes Crane, 1945 — Guyana, Argentina
 Zygoballus incertus (Banks, 1929) — Panama
 Zygoballus iridescens Banks, 1895 — USA
 Zygoballus lineatus (Mello-Leitão, 1944) — Argentina
 Zygoballus maculatipes Petrunkevitch, 1925 — Panama
 Zygoballus maculatus F. O. P-Cambridge, 1901 — Guatemala
 Zygoballus melloleitaoi Galiano, 1980 — Argentina
 Zygoballus minutus Peckham & Peckham, 1896 — Guatemala
 Zygoballus nervosus (Peckham & Peckham, 1888) — USA, Canada
 Zygoballus optatus Chickering, 1946 — Panama
 Zygoballus remotus Peckham & Peckham, 1896 — Guatemala
 Zygoballus rishwani Makhan, 2005 — Suriname
 Zygoballus rufipes Peckham & Peckham, 1885 — Canada to Costa Rica
 Zygoballus sexpunctatus (Hentz, 1845) — USA
 Zygoballus suavis Peckham & Peckham, 1895 — Jamaica
 Zygoballus tibialis F. O. P.-Cambridge, 1901 — Guatemala to Panama

References

External links

 Zygoballus at Bugguide.net
 Zygoballus at Salticidae: Diagnostic Drawings Library

Salticidae
Salticidae genera
Spiders of North America
Spiders of South America